Sükhbaatar is the capital of Selenge Province in northern Mongolia, on the Orkhon river. As of late 2007, the city population is 19,224.

History

The city was founded in 1940 and named after the Mongolian revolutionary leader Damdin Sükhbaatar.

Transport
Sükhbaatar is the northernmost railway station on the Trans-Mongolian Railway in Mongolia. The first railway station on the Russian side of the border is Naushki.

Taxi service is available at the railway station and about a block north. Taxis offer service within Sükhbaatar as well as neighbouring Sums, like Shaamar (10,000- 15,000 tugs for whole car or 2,000 per person), you can also get a taxi to Darkhan for 8,000-10,000 tugs per person.

Climate
Sükhbaatar has a dry-winter warm-summer continental climate (Köppen Dwb).

References

Districts of Selenge Province
Populated places established in 1940
Aimag centers
Mongolia–Russia border crossings
1940 establishments in Mongolia